Woodpecker is a 2008 comedy film directed by Alex Karpovsky and starring Jon Hyrns. The film follows Hyrns and his cohort, Wesley Yang, as they obsessively search the Arkansas bayou for proof that ivory-billed woodpecker is in fact not extinct.

Woodpecker is filmed in a docufiction style, set in the small Arkansas town of Brinkley. It incorporates faux-interviews with Brinkley residents recounting their experiences with the mysterious bird.

Hyrns becomes increasingly erratic and comic in his attempts to locate the animal.

Soundtrack

The film’s soundtrack received positive reviews.

References

American independent films
2008 films
2008 comedy films
American comedy films
2000s English-language films
2000s American films